Preston is a small locality in northwest London. It forms part of the London Borough of Brent and the northern part of Wembley. It is a residential suburb containing Preston Road Station (Metropolitan line) with some stores on either side. The area to the station's north is covered under the HA3 postcode and is, along with the area around South Kenton station to the west, normally considered part of Kenton.

Facilities
The Preston Manor School is located in the area, and JFS is also nearby. It also contains the award-winning Blue Oyster Fish Bar, the Kenton Hall venue, and a youth football club called Forest United. London bus routes 79, 204 and 223 serve Preston, the latter with a long hail and ride section to or from Kenton. Residents in both areas have voiced disapproval at plans to cut route 223 between Harrow and Northwick Park Hospital, likely to become effective in 2019. The change to the 223 has not come into effect as of August 2022. 

It is a grassed area with scattered trees, with two sports pavilions and a children's playground. There is access from Carlton Avenue East, College Road and Montpelier Rise.

Neighbouring areas

Gallery

Notable people
Lolly Adefope, comedian
John Lyon, founder of Harrow School

References

Areas of London
Districts of the London Borough of Brent
Places formerly in Middlesex
District centres of London